Marco Groppo (born 4 September 1960) is a former Italian professional cyclist. He most known for winning the Young rider Classification in the 1982 Giro d'Italia. His highest finishing in the Giro d'Italia was the year he won the Young rider classification, he placed ninth that year. He retired from cycling in 1989.

References

1960 births
Living people
Italian male cyclists
Cyclists from the Province of Varese